Ulysses is a modernist novel by Irish writer James Joyce. Parts of it were first serialized in the American journal The Little Review from March 1918 to December 1920, and the entire work was published in Paris by Sylvia Beach on 2 February 1922, Joyce's fortieth birthday. It is considered one of the most important works of modernist literature and has been called "a demonstration and summation of the entire movement." According to Declan Kiberd, "Before Joyce, no writer of fiction had so foregrounded the process of thinking."

Ulysses chronicles the appointments and encounters of the itinerant Leopold Bloom in Dublin in the course of an ordinary day, 16 June 1904. Ulysses is the Latinised name of Odysseus, the hero of Homer's epic poem the Odyssey, and the novel establishes a series of parallels between the poem and the novel, with structural correspondences between the characters and experiences of Bloom and Odysseus, Molly Bloom and Penelope, and Stephen Dedalus and Telemachus, in addition to events and themes of the early 20th-century context of modernism, Dublin, and Ireland's relationship to Britain. The novel is highly allusive and its prose imitates the styles of different periods of English literature.

Since its publication, the book has attracted controversy and scrutiny, ranging from an obscenity trial in the United States in 1921 to protracted textual "Joyce Wars." The novel's stream of consciousness technique, careful structuring, and experimental prose—replete with puns, parodies, and allusions—as well as its rich characterisation and broad humour have led it to be regarded as one of the greatest literary works in history; Joyce fans worldwide now celebrate 16 June as Bloomsday.

Background
Joyce first encountered the figure of Odysseus/Ulysses in Charles Lamb's Adventures of Ulysses, an adaptation of the Odyssey for children, which seems to have established the Latin name in Joyce's mind. At school he wrote an essay on the character, titled "My Favourite Hero". Joyce told Frank Budgen that he considered Ulysses the only all-round character in literature. He thought about calling his short-story collection Dubliners Ulysses in Dublin, but the idea grew from a story written in 1906, to a "short book" in 1907, to the vast novel he began in 1914.

Locations

 Leopold Bloom's home at 7 Eccles Street – Episode 4, Calypso; Episode 17, Ithaca; and Episode 18, Penelope
 Post office, Westland Row – Episode 5, Lotus Eaters
 Sweny's pharmacy, Lombard Street, Lincoln Place (where Bloom bought soap) – Episode 5, Lotus Eaters
 the Freeman's Journal, Prince's Street, off of O'Connell Street – Episode 7, Aeolus
 And – not far away – Graham Lemon's candy shop, 49 Lower O'Connell Street; it starts Episode 8, Lestrygonians
 Davy Byrne's pub – Episode 8, Lestrygonians
 National Library of Ireland – Episode 9, Scylla and Charybdis
 Ormond Hotel on the banks of the Liffey – Episode 11, Sirens
 Barney Kiernan's pub – Episode 12, Cyclops
 Maternity hospital – Episode 14, Oxen of the Sun
 Bella Cohen's brothel – Episode 15, Circe
 Cabman's shelter, Butt Bridge – Episode 16, Eumaeus

The action of the novel moves from one side of Dublin Bay to the other, opening in Sandycove to the South of the city and closing on Howth Head to the North.

Structure

Ulysses is divided into the three books (marked I, II, and III) and 18 episodes. The episodes do not have chapter headings or titles, and are numbered only in Gabler's edition. In the various editions the breaks between episodes are indicated in different ways; e.g., in the Modern Library edition each episode begins at the top of a new page.

Many parts of the book may seem chaotic and disorganized at first look; Joyce famously remarked that he had "placed in so many enigmas and mysteries that it would keep the professors busy for generations fighting over what I meant," which would ensure the novel's existence. The schema released by Stuart Gilbert and Herbert Gorman after publication to help defend Joyce from obscenity accusations made the links to The Odyssey clearer, and also explained the work's structure.

Joyce and Homer
Joyce divides Ulysses into 18 episodes that "roughly correspond to the episodes in Homer's Odyssey". Homer's Odyssey is divided into 24 books (sections).

Scholars have suggested that every episode of Ulysses has a theme, technique and correspondence between its characters and those of the Odyssey. The text of the novel does not include the episode titles used below, nor the correspondences, which originate from explanatory outlines Joyce sent to friends, known as the Linati and Gilbert schema. Joyce referred to the episodes by their Homeric titles in his letters. He took the idiosyncratic rendering of some of the titles (e.g., "Nausikaa" and the "Telemachiad") from Victor Bérard's two-volume Les Phéniciens et l'Odyssée, which he consulted in 1918 in the Zentralbibliothek Zürich.

While Joyce's novel takes place during one ordinary day in early 20th-century Dublin, in Homer's epic, Odysseus, "a Greek hero of the Trojan War ... took ten years to find his way from Troy to his home on the island of Ithaca". Furthermore, Homer's poem includes violent storms and a shipwreck, giants and monsters, gods and goddesses, a totally different world from Joyce's. Leopold Bloom, "a Jewish advertisement canvasser", corresponds to Odysseus in Homer's epic; Stephen Dedalus, the hero also of Joyce's earlier, largely autobiographical A Portrait of the Artist as a Young Man, corresponds to Odysseus's son Telemachus; and Bloom's wife Molly corresponds to Penelope, Odysseus's wife, who waited 20 years for him to return.

Joyce studied Greek with Paul G. Phocas as seen in his Zurich notebooks between 1915 and 1918.

Plot summary

Part I: Telemachia

Episode 1, Telemachus

At 8 a.m., Malachi “Buck” Mulligan, a boisterous medical student, calls aspiring writer Stephen Dedalus up to the roof of the Sandycove Martello tower, where they both live. There is tension between Dedalus and Mulligan stemming from a cruel remark Stephen overheard Mulligan make about his recently deceased mother and from the fact that Mulligan has invited an English student, Haines, to stay with them. The three men eat breakfast and walk to the shore, where Mulligan demands from Stephen the key to the tower and a loan. The three make plans to meet at a pub, The Ship, at 12:30pm. Departing, Stephen decides that he will not return to the tower that night, as Mulligan, the "usurper", has taken it over.

Episode 2, Nestor
Stephen is teaching a history class on the victories of Pyrrhus of Epirus. After class, one student, Cyril Sargent, stays behind so that Stephen can show him how to do a set of algebraic exercises. Stephen looks at Sargent's ugly face and tries to imagine Sargent's mother's love for him. He then visits unionist school headmaster Garrett Deasy, from whom he collects his pay. Deasy asks Stephen to take his long-winded letter about foot and mouth disease to a newspaper office for printing. The two discuss Irish history and Deasy lectures on what he believes is the role of Jews in the economy. As Stephen leaves, Deasy jokes that Ireland has "never persecuted the Jews" because the country "never let them in". This episode is the source of some of the novel's best-known lines, such as Dedalus's claim that "history is a nightmare from which I am trying to awake" and that God is "a shout in the street".

Episode 3, Proteus

Stephen walks along Sandymount Strand for some time, mulling various philosophical concepts, his family, his life as a student in Paris, and his mother's death. As he reminisces he lies down among some rocks, watches a couple whose dog urinates behind a rock, scribbles some ideas for poetry and picks his nose. This chapter is characterised by a stream of consciousness narrative style that changes focus wildly. Stephen's education is reflected in the many obscure references and foreign phrases employed in this episode, which have earned it a reputation for being one of the book's most difficult chapters.

Part II: Odyssey

Episode 4, Calypso
The narrative shifts abruptly. The time is again 8 a.m., but the action has moved across the city and to the second protagonist of the book, Leopold Bloom, a part-Jewish advertising canvasser. The episode opens with the line "Mr. Leopold Bloom ate with relish the inner organs of beasts and fowls." After starting to prepare breakfast, Bloom decides to walk to a butcher to buy a pork kidney. Returning home, he prepares breakfast and brings it with the mail to his wife Molly as she lounges in bed. One of the letters is from her concert manager Blazes Boylan, with whom she is having an affair. Bloom reads a letter from their daughter Milly Bloom, who tells him about her progress in the photography business in Mullingar. The episode closes with Bloom reading a magazine story titled Matcham's Masterstroke, by Mr. Philip Beaufoy, while defecating in the outhouse.

Episode 5, Lotus Eaters
 
While making his way to Westland Row post office Bloom is tormented by the knowledge that Molly will welcome Boylan into her bed later that day. At the post office he surreptitiously collects a love letter from one 'Martha Clifford' addressed to his pseudonym, 'Henry Flower.' He meets an acquaintance, and while they chat, Bloom attempts to ogle a woman wearing stockings, but is prevented by a passing tram. Next, he reads the letter from Martha Clifford and tears up the envelope in an alley. He wanders into a Catholic church service and muses on theology. The priest has the letters I.N.R.I. or I.H.S. on his back; Molly had told Bloom that they meant I have sinned or I have suffered, and Iron nails ran in. He buys a bar of lemon soap from a chemist. He then meets another acquaintance, Bantam Lyons, who mistakenly takes him to be offering a racing tip for the horse Throwaway. Finally, Bloom heads towards the baths.

Episode 6, Hades
The episode begins with Bloom entering a funeral carriage with three others, including Stephen's father. They drive to Paddy Dignam's funeral, making small talk on the way. The carriage passes both Stephen and Blazes Boylan. There is discussion of various forms of death and burial. Bloom is preoccupied by thoughts of his dead infant son, Rudy, and the suicide of his own father. They enter the chapel into the service and subsequently leave with the coffin cart. Bloom sees a mysterious man wearing a mackintosh during the burial. Bloom continues to reflect upon death, but at the end of the episode rejects morbid thoughts to embrace 'warm fullblooded life'.

Episode 7, Aeolus
At the office of the Freeman's Journal, Bloom attempts to place an ad. Although initially encouraged by the editor, he is unsuccessful. Stephen arrives bringing Deasy's letter about foot and mouth disease, but Stephen and Bloom do not meet. Stephen leads the editor and others to a pub, relating an anecdote on the way about "two Dublin vestals". The episode is broken into short segments by newspaper-style headlines, and is characterised by an abundance of rhetorical figures and devices.

Episode 8, Lestrygonians

Bloom's thoughts are peppered with references to food as lunchtime approaches. He meets an old flame, hears news of Mina Purefoy's labour, and helps a blind boy cross the street. He enters the restaurant of the Burton Hotel, where he is revolted by the sight of men eating like animals. He goes instead to Davy Byrne's pub, where he consumes a gorgonzola cheese sandwich and a glass of burgundy, and muses upon the early days of his relationship with Molly and how the marriage has declined: "Me. And me now." Bloom's thoughts touch on what goddesses and gods eat and drink. He ponders whether the statues of Greek goddesses in the National Museum have anuses as do mortals. On leaving the pub Bloom heads toward the museum, but spots Boylan across the street and, panicking, rushes into the gallery across the street from the museum.

Episode 9, Scylla and Charybdis

At the National Library, Stephen explains to some scholars his biographical theory of the works of Shakespeare, especially Hamlet, which he argues are based largely on the posited adultery of Shakespeare's wife. Buck Mulligan arrives and interrupts to read out the telegram that Stephen had sent him indicating that he would not make their planned rendezvous at The Ship. Bloom enters the National Library to look up an old copy of the ad he has been trying to place. He passes in between Stephen and Mulligan as they exit the library at the end of the episode.

Episode 10, Wandering Rocks
In this episode, nineteen short vignettes depict the movements of various characters, major and minor, through the streets of Dublin. The episode begins by following Father Conmee, a Jesuit priest, on his trip north, and ends with an account of the cavalcade of the Lord Lieutenant of Ireland, William Ward, Earl of Dudley, through the streets, which is encountered by several characters from the novel.

Episode 11, Sirens
In this episode, dominated by motifs of music, Bloom has dinner with Stephen's uncle at the Ormond hotel, while Molly's lover, Blazes Boylan, proceeds to his rendezvous with her. While dining, Bloom listens to the singing of Stephen's father and others, watches the seductive barmaids, and composes a reply to Martha Clifford's letter.

Episode 12, Cyclops
This chapter is narrated by an unnamed denizen of Dublin who works as a debt collector. The narrator goes to Barney Kiernan's pub where he meets a character referred to only as "The Citizen". This character is believed to be a satirisation of Michael Cusack, a founder member of the Gaelic Athletic Association. When Leopold Bloom enters the pub, he is berated by the Citizen, who is a fierce Fenian and anti-Semite. The episode ends with Bloom reminding the Citizen that his Saviour was a Jew. As Bloom leaves the pub, the Citizen throws a biscuit tin at Bloom's head, but misses. The chapter is marked by extended tangents made in voices other than that of the unnamed narrator; these include streams of legal jargon, a report of a boxing match, Biblical passages, and elements of Irish mythology.

Episode 13, Nausicaa
All the action of the episode takes place on the rocks of Sandymount Strand, the shoreline that Stephen visited in Episode 3. A young woman, Gerty MacDowell, is seated on the rocks with her two friends, Cissy Caffrey and Edy Boardman. The girls are taking care of three children, a baby, and four-year-old twins named Tommy and Jacky. Gerty contemplates love, marriage and femininity as night falls. The reader is gradually made aware that Bloom is watching her from a distance. Gerty teases the onlooker by exposing her legs and underwear, and Bloom, in turn, masturbates. Bloom's masturbatory climax is echoed by the fireworks at the nearby bazaar. As Gerty leaves, Bloom realises that she has a lame leg, and believes this is the reason she has been "left on the shelf". After several mental digressions he decides to visit Mina Purefoy at the maternity hospital. It is uncertain how much of the episode is Gerty's thoughts, and how much is Bloom's sexual fantasy. Some believe that the episode is divided into two halves: the first half the highly romanticized viewpoint of Gerty, and the other half that of the older and more realistic Bloom. Joyce himself said, however, that "nothing happened between [Gerty and Bloom]. It all took place in Bloom's imagination". Nausicaa attracted immense notoriety while the book was being published in serial form. It has also attracted great attention from scholars of disability in literature. The style of the first half of the episode borrows from (and parodies) romance magazines and novelettes.

Episode 14, Oxen of the Sun
Bloom visits the maternity hospital where Mina Purefoy is giving birth, and finally meets Stephen, who has been drinking with his medical student friends and is awaiting the promised arrival of Buck Mulligan. As the only father in the group of men, Bloom is concerned about Mina Purefoy in her labour. He starts thinking about his wife and the births of his two children. He also thinks about the loss of his only 'heir', Rudy. The young men become boisterous, and start discussing such topics as fertility, contraception and abortion. There is also a suggestion that Milly, Bloom's daughter, is in a relationship with one of the young men, Bannon. They continue on to a pub to continue drinking, following the successful birth of a son to Mina Purefoy. This chapter is remarkable for Joyce's wordplay, which, among other things, recapitulates the entire history of the English language. After a short incantation, the episode starts with latinate prose, Anglo-Saxon alliteration, and moves on through parodies of, among others, Malory, the King James Bible, Bunyan, Pepys, Defoe, Sterne, Walpole, Gibbon, Dickens, and Carlyle, before concluding in a Joycean version of contemporary slang. The development of the English language in the episode is believed to be aligned with the nine-month gestation period of the foetus in the womb.

Episode 15, Circe
Episode 15 is written as a play script, complete with stage directions. The plot is frequently interrupted by "hallucinations" experienced by Stephen and Bloom—fantastic manifestations of the fears and passions of the two characters. Stephen and his friend Lynch walk into Nighttown, Dublin's red-light district. Bloom pursues them and eventually finds them at Bella Cohen's brothel where, in the company of her workers including Zoe Higgins, Florry Talbot and Kitty Ricketts, he has a series of hallucinations regarding his sexual fetishes, fantasies and transgressions. Bloom is put in the dock to answer charges by a variety of sadistic, accusing women including Mrs Yelverton Barry, Mrs Bellingham and the Hon Mrs Mervyn Talboys. When Bloom witnesses Stephen overpaying in the brothel, he decides to hold onto the rest of Stephen's money for safekeeping. Stephen hallucinates that the rotting cadaver of his mother has risen up from the floor to confront him. Stephen cries Non serviam!, uses his walking stick to smash a chandelier, and flees the room. Bloom quickly pays Bella for the damage, then runs after Stephen. He finds Stephen engaged in an argument with an English soldier, Private Carr, who, after a perceived insult to the King, punches Stephen. The police arrive and the crowd disperses. As Bloom is tending to Stephen, he has a hallucination of Rudy, his deceased son, as an 11-year-old.

Part III: Nostos

Episode 16, Eumaeus
Bloom takes Stephen to a cabman's shelter near Butt Bridge to restore him to his senses. There, they encounter a drunken sailor, D. B. Murphy (W. B. Murphy in the 1922 text). The episode is dominated by the motif of confusion and mistaken identity, with Bloom, Stephen and Murphy's identities being repeatedly called into question. The narrative's rambling and laboured style in this episode reflects the protagonists' nervous exhaustion and confusion.

Episode 17, Ithaca
Bloom returns home with Stephen, makes him a cup of cocoa, discusses cultural and linguistic differences between them, considers the possibility of publishing Stephen's parable stories, and offers him a place to stay for the night. Stephen refuses Bloom's offer and is ambiguous in response to Bloom's proposal of future meetings. The two men urinate in the backyard, Stephen departs and wanders off into the night, and Bloom goes to bed, where Molly is sleeping. She awakens and questions him about his day. The episode is written in the form of a rigidly organised and "mathematical" catechism of 309 questions and answers, and was reportedly Joyce's favourite episode in the novel. The deep descriptions range from questions of astronomy to the trajectory of urination and include a list of 25 men that purports to be the "preceding series" of Molly's suitors and Bloom's reflections on them. While describing events apparently chosen randomly in ostensibly precise mathematical or scientific terms, the episode is rife with errors made by the undefined narrator, many or most of which are intentional by Joyce.

Episode 18, Penelope
The final episode consists of Molly Bloom's thoughts as she lies in bed next to her husband. The episode uses a stream-of-consciousness technique in eight paragraphs and lacks punctuation. Molly thinks about Boylan and Bloom, her past admirers, including Lieutenant Stanley G. Gardner, the events of the day, her childhood in Gibraltar, and her curtailed singing career. She also hints at a lesbian relationship in her youth, with a childhood friend, Hester Stanhope. These thoughts are occasionally interrupted by distractions, such as a train whistle or the need to urinate. Molly is surprised by the early arrival of her menstrual period, which she ascribes to her vigorous sex with Boylan. The episode concludes with Molly's remembrance of Bloom's marriage proposal, and of her acceptance: "he asked me would I yes to say yes my mountain flower and first I put my arms around him yes and drew him down to me so he could feel my breasts all perfume yes and his heart was going like mad and yes I said yes I will Yes."

Publication history

The publication history of Ulysses is complex. There have been at least 18 editions, and variations in different impressions of each edition.

According to Joyce scholar Jack Dalton, the first edition of Ulysses contained over 2,000 errors. As subsequent editions attempted to correct these mistakes, they would often add more, due in part to the difficulty of separating non-authorial errors from Joyce's deliberate "errors" devised to challenge the reader.

Notable editions include:
 Paris: Shakespeare and Company, 1922. The private, first edition published in Paris on 2 February 1922 (Joyce's 40th birthday) by Sylvia Beach's Shakespeare and Company. Beach commissioned Darantiere in Dijon to print 1,000 numbered copies consisting of 100 signed copies on Dutch handmade paper (350 francs), 150 numbered copies on vergé d’Arches paper (250 francs), and 750 copies on handmade paper (150 francs), plus an extra 20 unnumbered copies on mixed paper for libraries and press.
 London: Egoist Press, 1922. The first English edition published by Harriet Shaw Weaver's Egoist Press in October 1922. For legal reasons the book was printed on behalf of Egoist Press by John Rodker using the same printer, Darantiere, and plates as the first edition. This edition consisted of 2,000 numbered copies on handmade paper for sale plus 100 unnumbered copies for press, publicity and legal deposit libraries. A seven-page errata list compiled by Joyce, Weaver and Rodker was loosely inserted and contained 201 corrections. The U.S. Post Office reportedly burned up to 500 copies, as noted in later Shakespeare and Company editions.
 New York: Two Worlds Publishing Company, 1929. The first U.S. edition of the novel was pirated by Samuel Roth without Joyce's authorisation, and first published serially in Roth's Two Worlds Monthly, then later in a single volume in 1929. It was designed to closely mimic the 1927 Shakespeare and Company 9th printing but many errors and corruptions occurred during reproduction. Reportedly 2,000–3,000 copies were printed but the majority were seized and destroyed by the New York Society for the Suppression of Vice after a raid on Roth's offices on 4 October 1929 
 Hamburg: Odyssey Press, 1932. In two volumes. The title page of this edition states "The present edition may be regarded as the definitive standard edition, as it has been specially revised, at the author's request, by Stuart Gilbert.". This edition still contained errors but by its fourth revised printing (April 1939) it was considered the most accurate offering of the text and subsequently used as the basis for many later editions of the novel.
 New York: Random House, 1934. The first authorised U.S. edition, published after the decision in United States v. One Book Called Ulysses finding that the book was not obscene. Random House's founder Bennett Cerf chose to base this edition on a copy of the pirated Samuel Roth edition of 1929, which led it to reproduce many of that edition's errors.
 London: Bodley Head, 1936. The first edition printed and published in England. Set from the second impression of Odyssey Press's edition and proofed by Joyce.
 Bodley Head, 1960. Newly reset corrected edition based on the 1958 impression of the earlier Bodley Head edition. The source for many later editions by other publishers.
 Random House, 1961. Reset from the 1960 Bodley Head edition.
 Ulysses: A Critical and Synoptic Edition. Garland, 1984.  Edited by Hans Walter Gabler.
 Ulysses: A Reader's Edition. Lilliput Press, 1997.  Edited by Danis Rose.

"Joyce Wars"
Hans Walter Gabler's 1984 edition was the most sustained attempt to produce a corrected text, but it has received much criticism, most notably from John Kidd. Kidd's main theoretical criticism is of Gabler's choice of a patchwork of manuscripts as his copy-text (the base edition with which the editor compares each variant), but this fault stems from an assumption of the Anglo-American tradition of scholarly editing rather than the blend of French and German editorial theories that actually lay behind Gabler's reasoning. The choice of a composite copy-text is seen to be problematic in the eyes of some American editors, who generally favour the first edition of any particular work as copy-text.

Less subject to differing national editorial theories, however, is the claim that for hundreds of pages—about half the episodes of Ulysses—the extant manuscript is purported to be a "fair copy" that Joyce made for sale to a potential patron. (As it turned out, John Quinn, the Irish-American lawyer and collector, purchased the manuscript.) Diluting this charge somewhat is the fact that the theory of (now lost) final working drafts is Gabler's own. For the suspect episodes, the existing typescript is the last witness. Gabler attempted to reconstruct what he called "the continuous manuscript text", which had never physically existed, by adding together all of Joyce's accretions from the various sources. This allowed Gabler to produce a "synoptic text" indicating the stage at which each addition was inserted. Kidd and even some of Gabler's own advisers believe this method meant losing Joyce's final changes in about two thousand places. Far from being "continuous", the manuscripts seem to be opposite. Jerome McGann describes in detail the editorial principles of Gabler in his article for the journal Criticism, issue 27, 1985. In the wake of the controversy, still other commentators charged that Gabler's changes were motivated by a desire to secure a fresh copyright and another seventy-five years of royalties beyond a looming expiration date.

In June 1988 John Kidd published "The Scandal of Ulysses" in The New York Review of Books, charging that not only did Gabler's changes overturn Joyce's last revisions, but in another four hundred places Gabler failed to follow any manuscript whatever, making nonsense of his own premises. Kidd accused Gabler of unnecessarily changing Joyce's spelling, punctuation, use of accents, and all the small details he claimed to have been restoring. Instead, Gabler was actually following printed editions such as that of 1932, not the manuscripts. Gabler was found to have made genuine blunders, such as his changing the name of the real-life Dubliner Harry Thrift to 'Shrift' and cricketer Captain Buller to 'Culler' on the basis of handwriting irregularities in the extant manuscript. (These "corrections" were undone by Gabler in 1986.) Kidd stated that many of Gabler's errors resulted from Gabler's use of facsimiles rather than original manuscripts.

In December 1988, Charles Rossman's "The New Ulysses: The Hidden Controversy" for The New York Review revealed that some of Gabler's own advisers felt too many changes were being made, but that the publishers were pushing for as many alterations as possible. Then Kidd produced a 174-page critique that filled an entire issue of the Papers of the Bibliographical Society of America, dated the same month. This "Inquiry into Ulysses: The Corrected Text" was published the next year in book format and on floppy disk by Kidd's James Joyce Research Center at Boston University.

Gabler and others, including Michael Groden, have rejected Kidd's critique. In his 1993 afterword to the Gabler edition, Groden writes that Kidd's lists of supposed errors were constructed "with so little demonstrated understanding of Gabler's theoretical assumptions and procedures...that they can point to errors or misjudgments only by accident." The scholarly community remains divided.

Gabler edition dropped

In 1990, Gabler's American publisher Random House, after consulting a committee of scholars, replaced the Gabler edition with its 1961 version, and in the United Kingdom the Bodley Head press revived its 1960 version (upon which Random House's 1961 version is based). In both the UK and US, Everyman's Library also republished the 1960 Ulysses. In 1992, Penguin dropped Gabler and reprinted the 1960 text. The Gabler version remained available from Vintage International. Reprints of the 1922 first edition have also become widely available since 1 January 2012, when this edition entered the public domain under U.S. copyright law.

In 1992, W. W. Norton announced that it would publish Kidd's much-anticipated edition of Ulysses as part of "The Dublin Edition of the Works of James Joyce" series. This book had to be withdrawn when the Joyce estate objected. For a period thereafter the estate refused to authorise any further editions of Joyce's work. This ended when it agreed to allow Wordsworth Editions to bring out a bargain version of the novel (a reprint of the 1932 Odyssey Press edition) in January 2010, ahead of copyright expiration in 2012.

Censorship

Written over a seven-year period from 1914 to 1921, Ulysses was serialised in the American journal The Little Review from 1918 to 1920, when the publication of the Nausicaä episode led to a prosecution for obscenity under the Comstock Act of 1873, which made it illegal to circulate materials deemed obscene in the U.S. mail. In 1919, sections of the novel also appeared in the London literary journal The Egoist, but the novel itself was banned in the United Kingdom until 1936. Joyce had resolved that the book would be published on his 40th birthday, 2 February 1922, and Sylvia Beach, Joyce's publisher in Paris, received the first three copies from the printer that morning.

The 1920 prosecution in the US was brought after The Little Review serialised a passage of the book depicting characters masturbating. Three earlier chapters had been banned by the US Post Office, but it was Secretary of the New York Society for the Suppression of Vice John S. Sumner who instigated this legal action. The Post Office did partially suppress the "Nausicaä" edition of The Little Review. Legal historian Edward de Grazia has argued that few readers would have been fully aware of the masturbation in the text, given the metaphoric language. Irene Gammel extends this argument to suggest that the obscenity allegations brought against The Little Review were influenced by the Baroness Elsa von Freytag-Loringhoven's more explicit poetry, which had appeared alongside the serialization of Ulysses. At the trial in 1921 the magazine was declared obscene and, as a result, Ulysses was effectively banned in the United States. Throughout the 1920s, the United States Post Office Department burned copies of the novel.

In 1932, Random House and lawyer Morris Ernst arranged to import the French edition and have a copy seized by Customs. Random House contested the seizure, and in United States v. One Book Called Ulysses, U.S. District Judge John M. Woolsey ruled that the book was not pornographic and therefore could not be obscene, a decision Stuart Gilbert called "epoch-making". The Second Circuit Court of Appeals affirmed the ruling in 1934. The U.S. thus became the first English-speaking country where the book was freely available. Although Ireland's Censorship of Publications Board never banned Ulysses, a customs loophole prevented it from being allowed into Ireland. It was first openly available in Ireland in the 1960s.

Literary significance and critical reception
In a review in The Dial, T. S. Eliot said of Ulysses: "I hold this book to be the most important expression which the present age has found; it is a book to which we are all indebted, and from which none of us can escape." He went on to assert that Joyce was not at fault if people after him did not understand it: "The next generation is responsible for its own soul; a man of genius is responsible to his peers, not to a studio full of uneducated and undisciplined coxcombs."

Ulysses has been called "the most prominent landmark in modernist literature", a work where life's complexities are depicted with "unprecedented, and unequalled, linguistic and stylistic virtuosity". That style has been called the finest example of stream-of-consciousness in modern fiction, with Joyce going deeper and farther than any other novelist in interior monologue and stream of consciousness. This technique has been praised for its faithful representation of the flow of thought, feeling, and mental reflection, as well as shifts of mood.

Literary critic Edmund Wilson noted that Ulysses attempts to render "as precisely and as directly as it is possible in words to do, what our participation in life is like—or rather, what it seems to us like as from moment to moment we live." Stuart Gilbert said that the "personages of Ulysses are not fictitious" but that "these people are as they must be; they act, we see, according to some lex eterna, an ineluctable condition of their very existence". Through these characters Joyce "achieves a coherent and integral interpretation of life".

Joyce uses "metaphors, symbols, ambiguities, and overtones which gradually link themselves together so as to form a network of connections binding the whole" work. This system of connections gives the novel a wide, more universal significance, as "Leopold Bloom becomes a modern Ulysses, an Everyman in a Dublin which becomes a microcosm of the world." Eliot called this system the "mythic method": "a way of controlling, of ordering, of giving a shape and a significance to the immense panorama of futility and anarchy which is contemporary history". Novelist Vladimir Nabokov called Ulysses a "divine work of art" and the greatest masterpiece of 20th-century prose, and said that "it towers above the rest of Joyce's writing" with "noble originality, unique lucidity of thought and style". Psychology professor Charles Fernyhough called Ulysses "the archetypal stream of consciousness novel".

The book had its critics, largely in response to its then-uncommon inclusion of sexual elements. Shane Leslie called Ulysses "literary Bolshevism ... experimental, anti-conventional, anti-Christian, chaotic, totally unmoral". Karl Radek called it "a heap of dung, crawling with worms, photographed by a cinema camera through a microscope". Sisley Huddleston, writing for the Observer, wrote: "I confess that I cannot see how the work upon which Mr Joyce spent seven strenuous years, years of wrestling and of agony, can ever be given to the public." Virginia Woolf wrote, "Ulysses was a memorable catastrophe—immense in daring, terrific in disaster." One newspaper pundit said it contained "secret sewers of vice ... canalized in its flood of unimaginable thoughts, images, and pornographic words" and "revolting blasphemies" that "debases and perverts and degrades the noble gift of imagination and wit and lordship of language".

Media adaptations

Theatre
Ulysses in Nighttown, based on Episode 15 ("Circe"), premiered off-Broadway in 1958, with Zero Mostel as Bloom; it debuted on Broadway in 1974.

In 2006, playwright Sheila Callaghan's Dead City, a contemporary stage adaptation of the book set in New York City, and featuring the male figures Bloom and Dedalus reimagined as female characters Samantha Blossom and Jewel Jupiter, was produced in Manhattan by New Georges.

In 2012, an adaption was staged in Glasgow, written by Dermot Bolger and directed by Andy Arnold. The production first premiered at the Tron Theatre, and later toured in Dublin, Belfast, Cork, made an appearance at the Edinburgh Festival, and was performed in China. In 2017 a revised version of Bolger's adaption, directed and designed by Graham McLaren, premiered at Ireland's National Theatre, The Abbey Theatre in Dublin, as part of the 2017 Dublin Theatre Festival. It was revived in June 2018, and the script was published by Oberon Books.

In 2013, a new stage adaptation of the novel, Gibraltar, was produced in New York by the Irish Repertory Theatre. It was written by and starred Patrick Fitzgerald and directed by Terry Kinney. This two-person play focused on the love story of Bloom and Molly, played by Cara Seymour.

Film
In 1967, a film version of the book was directed by Joseph Strick. Starring Milo O'Shea as Bloom, it was nominated for an Academy Award for Best Adapted Screenplay.

In 2003, a movie version, Bloom, was released starring Stephen Rea and Angeline Ball.

Television
In 1988, the episode "James Joyce's Ulysses" of the documentary series The Modern World: Ten Great Writers was shown on Channel 4. Some of the novel's scenes were dramatised. David Suchet played Leopold Bloom.

In September 2022, the episode "James Joyce's Ulysses" of the documentary series Arena, was shown on BBC.

Audio
On Bloomsday 1982, RTÉ, Ireland's national broadcaster, aired a full-cast, unabridged, dramatised radio production of Ulysses, that ran uninterrupted for 29 hours and 45 minutes.

The unabridged text of Ulysses has been performed by Jim Norton with Marcella Riordan. Naxos Records released the recording on 22 audio CDs in 2004. It follows an earlier abridged recording with the same actors.

On Bloomsday 2010, author Frank Delaney launched a series of weekly podcasts called Re:Joyce that took listeners page by page through Ulysses, discussing its allusions, historical context and references. The podcast ran until Delaney's death in 2017, at which point it was on the "Wandering Rocks" chapter.

BBC Radio 4 aired a new nine-part adaptation dramatised by Robin Brooks and produced/directed by Jeremy Mortimer, and starring Stephen Rea as the Narrator, Henry Goodman as Bloom, Niamh Cusack as Molly and Andrew Scott as Dedalus, for Bloomsday 2012, beginning on 16 June 2012.

Comedy/satire recording troupe The Firesign Theatre ends its 1969 album "How Can You Be in Two Places at Once When You're Not Anywhere at All?" with a male voice reciting the final lines of Molly Bloom's soliloquy.

Music
The music CD Classical Ulysses was launched by the James Joyce Society in Dublin for the Bloomsday100 celebrations in 2004. It contained recorded versions of the classical music mentioned in the book.

Kate Bush's song "Flower of the Mountain" (originally the title track on The Sensual World) sets to music the end of Molly Bloom's soliloquy.

Thema (Omaggio a Joyce) is an electroacoustic composition for voice and tape by Luciano Berio. Composed between 1958 and 1959, it is based on the interpretative reading of the poem "Sirens" from chapter 11 of the novel. It is sung/voiced by Cathy Berberian. Umberto Eco, a lifelong admirer of Joyce, also contributed to its realisation.

Prose
Jacob M. Appel's novel The Biology of Luck (2013) is a retelling of Ulysses set in New York City. It features an inept tour guide, Larry Bloom, whose adventures parallel those of Leopold Bloom through Dublin.

Notes

References
 
 Blamires, Harry. A Short History of English Literature, Routledge. 2d edition, 2013.
 Borach, Georges. Conversations with James Joyce, translated by Joseph Prescott, College English, 15 (March 1954)
 Burgess, Anthony. Here Comes Everybody: An Introduction to James Joyce for the Ordinary Reader (1965); also published as Re Joyce.
 Burgess, Anthony. Joysprick: An Introduction to the Language of James Joyce (1973).
 Budgen, Frank. James Joyce and the Making of Ulysses. Bloomington: Indiana University Press, (1960).
 
 Dalton, Jack. The Text of Ulysses in Fritz Senn, ed. New Light on Joyce from the Dublin Symposium. Indiana University Press (1972).
 Ellmann, Richard. James Joyce. Oxford University Press, revised edition (1983).
 Ellmann, Richard, ed. Selected Letters of James Joyce. The Viking Press (1975).
 Gilbert, Stuart. James Joyce's Ulysses: A study, Faber and Faber (1930).
 Gorman, Herbert. James Joyce: A Definitive Biography (1939).
 Hardiman, Adrian (2017). Joyce in Court. London: Head of Zeus Press. .
 Joseph M. Hassett The Ulysses Trials: Beauty and Truth Meet the Law. Dublin: The Lilliput Press (2016). .

Further reading
 Arnold, Bruce. The Scandal of Ulysses: The Life and Afterlife of a Twentieth Century Masterpiece. Rev. ed. Dublin: Liffey Press, 2004. .
 Attridge, Derek, ed. James Joyce's Ulysses: A Casebook. Oxford and New York: Oxford UP, 2004. .
 
 Benstock, Bernard. Critical Essays on James Joyce's Ulysses. Boston: G. K. Hall, 1989. .
 Birmingham, Kevin. The Most Dangerous Book: The Battle for James Joyce's Ulysses. London: Head of Zeus Ltd., 2014. 
 Duffy, Enda, The Subaltern Ulysses. Minneapolis: University of Minnesota Press, 1994. .
 Ellmann, Richard. Ulysses on the Liffey. New York: Oxford UP, 1972. .
 French, Marilyn. The Book as World: James Joyce's Ulysses. Cambridge, MA: Harvard UP, 1976. .
 Gillespie, Michael Patrick and A. Nicholas Fargnoli, eds. Ulysses in Critical Perspective. Gainesville: University Press of Florida, 2006. .
 Goldberg, Samuel Louis. The Classical Temper: A Study of James Joyce's Ulysses. New York: Barnes and Noble, 1961 and 1969.
 Goldman, Jonathan."The Difficult Odyssey of James Joyce’s ‘Ulysses’". The Village Voice (January 28, 2022).
 Henke, Suzette. Joyce's Moraculous Sindbook: A Study of Ulysses. Columbus: Ohio State UP, 1978. .
 Kiberd, Declan. Ulysses and Us: The Art of Everyday Living. London: Faber and Faber, 2009 
 Killeen, Terence. Ulysses Unbound: A Reader's Companion to James Joyce's Ulysses. Bray, County Wicklow, Ireland: Wordwell, 2004. .
  
 McCarthy, Patrick A. Ulysses: Portals of Discovery. Boston: Twayne Publishers, 1990. .
 McKenna, Bernard. James Joyce's Ulysses: A Reference Guide. Westport, CT: Greenwood Press, 2002. .
 Murphy, Niall. A Bloomsday Postcard. Dublin: Lilliput Press, 2004. .
 
 Norris, Margot. A Companion to James Joyce's Ulysses: Biographical and Historical Contexts, Critical History, and Essays From Five Contemporary Critical Perspectives. Boston: Bedford Books, 1998. .
 Norris, Margot. Virgin and Veteran Readings of Ulysses. New York: Palgrave Macmillan, 2011. .
 Rickard, John S. Joyce's Book of Memory: The Mnemotechnic of Ulysses. Durham: Duke University Press, 1999. .
 Schutte, William M. James. Index of Recurrent Elements in James Joyce's Ulysses. Carbondale: Southern Illinois UP, 1982. .
 Thornton, Weldon. Allusions in Ulysses: An Annotated List. Chapel Hill: University of North Carolina Press, 1968 and 1973. .
 Vanderham, Paul. James Joyce and Censorship: The Trials of Ulysses. New York: New York UP, 1997. .

List of editions in print

Facsimile texts of the manuscript
 Ulysses, a three-volume facsimile copy of the complete, handwritten manuscript. Introduction by Harry Levin; bibliographical preface by Clive Driver. Philip H. &. A.S.W. Rosenbach Foundation (now known as the Rosenbach Museum & Library). New York: Octagon Books (1975).
Serial text published in the Little Review, 1918–1920
 The Little Review Ulysses, edited by Mark Gaipa, Sean Latham and Robert Scholes, Yale University Press, 2015.

Facsimile texts of the 1922 first edition
 Ulysses, The 1922 Text, with an introduction and notes by Jeri Johnson, Oxford University Press (1993). 
 Ulysses: A Facsimile of the First Edition Published in Paris in 1922, Orchises Press (1998). 
 Ulysses: With a new Introduction by Enda Duffy – An unabridged republication of the original Shakespeare and Company edition, published in Paris by Sylvia Beach, 1922, Dover Publications (2009).

Based on the 1932 Odyssey Press edition
 Ulysses, Wordsworth Classics (2010). Introduction by Cedric Watts.

Based on the 1939 Odyssey Press edition
 Ulysses, Alma Classics (2012), with an introduction and notes by Sam Slote, Trinity College, Dublin.

Based on the 1960 Bodley Head/1961 Random House editions
 Ulysses, Vintage International (1990). 
 Ulysses: Annotated Student's Edition, with an introduction and notes by Declan Kiberd, Penguin Twentieth Century Classics (1992). 
 Ulysses: The 1934 Text, As Corrected and Reset in 1961, Modern Library (1992). Foreword by Morris L. Ernst. 
 Ulysses, Everyman's Library (1997). 
 Ulysses, Penguin Modern Classics (2000). Introduction by Declan Kiberd.

Based on the 1984 Gabler edition
 Ulysses: The corrected text, Edited by Hans Walter Gabler with Wolfhard Steppe and Claus Melchior; preface by Richard Ellmann, Vintage International (1986). This follows the disputed Garland Edition.

External links

General
 Ulysses at the British Library
 The Little Review at The Modernist Journals Project includes all 23 serialised instalments of Ulysses
 Schemata of Ulysses
 The text of Joseph Collins's 1922 New York Times review of Ulysses
 Publication history of Ulysses

Electronic versions

  (London: Bodley Head, 1937.)
 Ulysses online audiobook.
 
 1982 full-cast recording from RTÉ Radio
 James Joyce reading from Ulysses: James Joyce reading an excerpt from the Aeolus episode. Recorded in 1924.	
 Friends of Shakespeare and Company read Ulysses

 
1922 novels
Adultery in novels
Censored books
Fiction set in 1904
Irish novels adapted into films
Irish novels adapted into plays
Modern adaptations of the Odyssey
Modernist novels
Nonlinear narrative novels
Novels about cities
Novels based on the Odyssey
Novels by James Joyce
Novels first published in serial form
Novels set in Dublin (city)
Novels set in one day
Obscenity controversies in literature
Works subject to a lawsuit